Mount Yamin (also Puncak Yamin or Prins Hendrik-top) is a peak found in Highland Papua Province in the Indonesian part of New Guinea . Rising to around 4,540 m (14,900 ft), it is the fourth highest freestanding mountain in Papua. The mountain was first climbed by an Indonesian party in 2018 as document in a YouTube video titled "WANADRI | EKSPEDISI PUNCAK YAMIN PAPUA 2018".

Glaciology 

In 1913, Mount Yamin (or Prins Hendrik-top, now Puncak Yamin) was named and reported to have some "eternal" snow. However, this "snow" has disappeared since then.

See also 
 List of highest mountains of New Guinea

Sources 
 "Puncak Yamin" on Peakery.com

Mountains of Western New Guinea